Geoffry Hairemans (born 21 October 1991) is a Belgian footballer who currently plays as a midfielder for Mechelen in the Belgian First Division A.

Career
He joined the Dutch Eerste Divisie side De Graafschap on 22 January 2010, and after spells with Lierse, Turnhout and Heist, he returned to his childhood team Antwerp for the 2015 season.

On 2 September 2019, he signed a 3-year contract with K.V. Mechelen.

On 25 november 2021 Hairemans prolonged his contract at K.V. Mechelen till 2025.

Career statistics

References

External links
 Voetbal International:  
 

1991 births
Living people
Belgian footballers
Royal Antwerp F.C. players
De Graafschap players
Lierse S.K. players
KFC Turnhout players
Challenger Pro League players
Belgian Pro League players
Eredivisie players
Eerste Divisie players
People from Wilrijk
Belgian expatriate footballers
Expatriate footballers in the Netherlands
K.S.K. Heist players
K.V. Mechelen players
Association football midfielders
Footballers from Antwerp